The Diplomatic Protection Service (DPS), sometimes referred to as the Diplomatic Protection Squad, is a branch of the New Zealand Police that provides personal security for both national and visiting diplomats and VIPs. National VIPs that receive constant protection are the prime minister and the governor-general, while ministers, members of Parliament, the judiciary and the leader of the Opposition receive protection as needed. Protection is provided both in New Zealand and abroad. Previous visiting VIPs afforded DPS protection have included Tiger Woods during the 2002 New Zealand Open, and FBI Director Robert Mueller. The DPS also patrols foreign embassies, consulates and high commissions.

The squad is based in the capital Wellington, where the majority of foreign diplomatic missions are. Officers are experienced members of the New Zealand Police, who pass the DPS course at the Royal New Zealand Police College. The course has training on topics such as diplomatic immunity and unarmed combat. Squad members usually operate in plain clothes, and all genders can be squad members.

The New Zealand Police established the DPS in the mid-1970s, to meet New Zealand's obligations under the Vienna Convention on Diplomatic Relations and Consular Relations.

Equipment
The DPS routinely carry firearms, in contrast to the regular police which generally do not. A 1993 report for the U.S. World Factbook of Criminal Justice Systems stated DPS officers have access to semi-automatic pistols.

In May 2008, the DPS were testing a Holden Captiva SUV, to replace the unmarked Holden sedans in use at the time.

Operations

 30 June 2000 - Squad members stand guard inside the Turkish consulate in Auckland, following Kurdish protests at the arrest of Abdullah Öcalan.
 September 2001 - Following the September 11 attacks, members of the DPS, Armed Offenders Squad and the Special Tactics Group were involved in operations for two months at the Embassy of the United States in Wellington. It was the first time armed New Zealand police conducted operations at the U.S. Embassy.
 2002 - Operation Links, 400 police, including members of the DPS, protected players including Tiger Woods during the New Zealand Open.

Incidents
When the prime minister travels by road the DPS normally have a vehicle following behind, closer than is generally safe, to prevent other vehicles getting in between. The close proximity of the escort vehicle has caused a few minor nose-to-tail accidents, such as twice in six weeks during 2000, and on Ponsonby Road on 9 December 2005.
  – A DPS officer accidentally discharged his pistol into a briefcase aboard a foreign VIP aircraft, on the ground in Christchurch. Police stated, "The bullet lodged in the battery pack of a police radio in the briefcase."
 2000 – Prime Minister Helen Clark criticised the DPS handling of a state visit by Chinese President Jiang Zemin the previous year –  the DPS sought to minimise the president's exposure to protesters and save the government any embarrassment, which Clark rebuked by saying it was not in the spirit of democracy.
 17 July 2004 – Helen Clark's motorcade travels at speeds of up to 172 km/h, to catch a flight at Christchurch after a flight from Timaru was cancelled. The Timaru District Court acquitted a DPS officer of all six charges relating to dangerous driving, and the Police Complaints Authority praised a subsequent review of the Diplomatic Protection Squad standard operating procedures and urgent duty driving.
 13 April 2005 – A door blew open on a six-seater charter airplane carrying Prime Minister Helen Clark. DPS officers Constable John Burridge and Senior Constable Dave Reid spent fifteen minutes holding the door closed with the aid of a baton, until the plane landed safely. Both officers later received Police silver merit awards for their actions.
 August 2007 – The DPS are involved in shutting down a boy racer website that contained death threats against MP Clayton Cosgrove.
 2007 – Two breaches lead to a review of security at Helen Clark's Mount Eden home, after taggers were able to put graffiti on the house, and a man who had robbed a dairy was able to hide in the garden while changing his clothes.
 November 2008 – New Prime Minister John Key's property in Parnell, Auckland caused some security problems for the DPS due to the large size (2,340 m²), and the pricing and availability of accommodation for officers.
 February 2009 – On Waitangi Day, Prime Minister John Key is manhandled by a protester as he walks towards a marae after getting out of his car. The incident caused speculation about the efficiency of the DPS.
December 2017 – Newly-appointed Prime Minister Jacinda Ardern's Auckland property caused some security issues due to the small size of the property and because no close proximity accommodation has been sought yet, so the DPS rotate sittings in un-marked vehicles.

References

External links
 Diplomatic Protection Service at the New Zealand Police website

New Zealand Police
Bodyguards
Protective security units